Yvonne Tasker is a British author and professor of media and communication in the School of Media and Communication at the University of Leeds. Tasker was previously professor of film studies and dean of the Faculty of Arts and Humanities at University of East Anglia.

Author
Tasker is a scholar in the field of film studies, gender and the media, and the politics of popular culture. She is the author of a number of books which have made a contribution to the field of film studies including Spectacular Bodies, Working Girls  and The Hollywood Action and Adventure Film. Tasker also co-wrote, with Diane Negra, Interrogating Postfeminism: Gender and the Politics of Popular Culture (Duke University Press, 2007), a foundational text of postfeminism and popular culture. Tasker completed her PhD in Film Studies at the University of Warwick.

Research
Her current research includes the Arts and Humanities Research Council funded project Jill Craigie: Film Pioneer that explores the career of documentary maker Jill Craigie. The project works in partnership with Lizzie Thynne (University of Sussex) and Sadie Wearing (London School of Economics) and will create an experimental film biography of Craigie and a co-authored book.

References 

Living people
Academics of the University of Leeds
21st-century British women writers
British university and college faculty deans
1964 births
Academics of the University of East Anglia
21st-century British writers
20th-century British women writers
20th-century British writers
Alumni of the University of Warwick